The Dutch Improved Red Pied, is a recentlydeveloped Dutch breed of beef cattle. It derives from the dual-purpose Meuse-Rhine-Issel breed, and is characterised by a high incidence of the double-muscling gene. A breed association was started in 1988.

History 

The Dutch Improved Red Pied derives from the Meuse-Rhine-Issel, a dual-purpose breed reared both for milk and for beef. The muscular hyperplasia known as double muscling was first observed in that breed in 1937, but because of the associated dystocia was regarded as undesirable or as a defect. With the greater availability of antibiotics in the years after the Second World War, it became possible to deliver calves by Caesarian section, and from the 1960s semen from double-muscled Meuse-Rhine-Issel bulls became available for artificial insemination. Selection of these animals for beef production alone led to the creation of the Verbeterd Roodbont, for which a breed association was started in 1988.

In the twenty-first century, a research project aimed to reduce the proportion of births requiring delivery by Caesarian section to less than half by 2020.

Characteristics 

The cattle are red pied and of medium size. Increased size is one of the aims of selection in the breed; breeding bulls should reach a height at the withers of at least  by the age of three.

References 

Cattle breeds originating in the Netherlands